Artur Leonhard Kasterpalu (14 July 1897 Jõgisoo Parish, Lääne County – 2 June 1942 Sverdlovsk, Russia) was an Estonian politician. He was a member of VI Riigikogu (its Chamber of Deputies).

References

1897 births
1942 deaths
Members of the Riigivolikogu
Members of the Estonian National Assembly
Estonian people executed by the Soviet Union
People from Lääne-Nigula Parish